Devin Holland (born October 18, 1988) is an American football safety who is currently a free agent. He was signed by the Tampa Bay Buccaneers as an undrafted free agent in 2011. He played college football for McNeese State University and Tulane University prior.

Professional career

Tampa Bay Buccaneers
Holland was signed as an undrafted free agent with the Tampa Bay Buccaneers on July 26, 2011. During the 2011 preseason, he was given two fines one for $5,000 and the other for $10,000.

The Buccaneers released him on July 26, 2012.

Washington Redskins
Holland was signed to a futures contract by the Washington Redskins on January 3, 2013. The Redskins released him on July 25, 2013.

References

External links
Tampa Bay Buccaneers bio
McNeese Cowboys bio
Tulane Green Wave bio

1988 births
Living people
Players of American football from Baton Rouge, Louisiana
American football safeties
Tulane Green Wave football players
McNeese Cowboys football players
Tampa Bay Buccaneers players
Washington Redskins players